Lagerevo (Lağır) is a rural locality (a selo) and the administrative centre of Lagerevsky Selsoviet, Salavatsky District, Bashkortostan, Russia. The population was 856 as of 2010. There are 10 streets.

Geography 
Lagerevo is located 37 km northeast of Maloyaz (the district's administrative centre) by road. Sharyakovo is the nearest rural locality.

References

External links

Rural localities in Salavatsky District